Cybil (short for the Cyber Implementation Language of the Control Data Network Operating System) was a Pascal-like language developed at Control Data Corporation for the Cyber computer family.  Cybil was used as the implementation language for the NOS/VE operating system on the CDC Cyber series and was also used to write the eOS operating system for the ETA10 supercomputer in the 1980s.

References

Control Data Corporation mainframe software
Pascal programming language family
Systems programming languages